Michael "Mikal" Patrick Cronin (born 1985) is an American musician and songwriter. He has released four solo albums and several singles. Cronin was a member of the bands Okie Dokie, Epsilons, Party Fowl and Moonhearts, and is a regular and longtime member of Ty Segall's live band, contributing bass guitar, backing vocals and saxophone; he has also released an album and a single in collaboration with Segall. Cronin earned his Bachelor of Fine Arts in music from California Institute of the Arts.

Discography

As a solo artist

Studio albums
Mikal Cronin – CD/LP (2011; Trouble in Mind)
MCII – CD/LP (2013; Merge Records)
MCIII – CD/LP (2015; Merge Records)
Seeker – CD/LP (2019; Merge Records)

Singles/EPs
Gone – 7" (2010; Goodbye Boozy Records)
Tide – 7" (2011; Goner Records)
Violitionist Acoustic Sessions 7" (2012: Turntable Kitchen)

Collaborations

With Ty Segall
Pop Song – 7" (2009; Goodbye Boozy Records)
Reverse Shark Attack – Cassette/LP (2009; Burger Records issued cassette only / Kill Shaman Records issued LP only)
Group Flex (Contribute Tracks: Fame; Suffragette City) 6 x Flexi Disc/Book (2011; Castle Face)
Emotional Mugger (2016)
Ty Segall (2017)
Freedom's Goblin (2018)
First Taste (2019)
Harmonizer (2021)

As part of other bands

Epsilons
Evil Robots – CD/EP (2005, Modern Sleeze)
Epsilons / Hips (split with Hips) – 7" (2006; olFactory Records)
Epsilons – CD/LP (2006; Retard Disco issued CD only / Young Cubs issued LP only)
Killed 'Em Deader 'N A Six Card Poker Hand – CD/LP (2007; Retard Disco issued CD only / HBSP-2X issued LP only)

Charlie and the Moonhearts
Charlie and The Moonhearts – Cassette (2007, Red Handed Recordings)
I Think You're Swell – 7" (2007, Goodbye Boozy Records)
Drop In Drop Out – 7" (2008, Tic Tac Totally)
Thunderbeast – Cassette (2008, Telephone Explosion)
Real Hot Breakers – 7" (2009, Trouble in Mind)
Charlie & The Moonhearts / Teen Anger  (split with Teen Anger) – LP (2009; Telephone Explosion Records)
Moonhearts – LP (2010, Tic Tac Totally)
Split (with Ty Segall / CoCoComa / The White Wires) – 7" (2010; Trouble in Mind)

Party Fowl
Party Fowl – 7" (2008; Post Present Medium)
STD's – 7" (2008; Goodbye Boozy Records)

Okie Dokie
Badhammer – 7" (2009; Goodbye Boozy Records)
Okie Dokie – 10" (2009; Aagoo)
Sorrow/Jubilance – 7" Split with Nü Sensae (2010; Swill Children)

Ty Segall Band
Slaughterhouse – CD/LP (2012, In The Red Records)

Thee Oh Sees
Putrifiers II (2012)
Drop (2014)

References

Place of birth missing (living people)
Living people
Singer-songwriters from California
American indie rock musicians
American rock guitarists
American male bass guitarists
American rock bass guitarists
American male singer-songwriters
American rock singers
American rock songwriters
1985 births
Power pop musicians
Guitarists from California
21st-century American singers
21st-century American bass guitarists
21st-century American male singers
Merge Records artists